Tiger Ramudu is a 1962 Indian Telugu-language action drama film, produced by Patnam Chinna Rao and Vaddi Sriramulu and directed by C. S. Rao. It stars N. T. Rama Rao and Rajasulochana, with music composed by Ghantasala.

Plot 
Ramu (Master Nagaraju) a good lad spoiled by his mother Rajyam (Hemalatha), she encourages him to steal petty things in his childhood, which turns him into a big burglar by the name Tiger Ramudu (N. T. Rama Rao). The entire Police Department is in search of him and the government appoints special CID officer Prabhakar (S. V. Ranga Rao) to catch him. Prabhakar traces him and attacks his den, everyone in his gang dies except Ramu and the department announces that Tiger Ramudu has died. Ramu changes his name to Mohan gets acquainted with another thief Brahmam (Relangi) and both of them open a jewelry shop with stolen ornaments. Once Ramu rescues a beautiful girl Radha (Rajasulochana), Prabhakar's sister and they fall in love. Prabhakar also agrees for their alliance without knowing the reality. After the marriage, when Radha becomes pregnant Ramu decides to get rid of this criminal life. But Brahmam assigns him a final task. In that process, Prabhakar identifies him as Tiger Ramudu and tries to arrest him and he flies. Knowing the truth Radha collapses after giving birth to a baby boy she has to leave the house to pull out of fire her brother's honor. Here Ramu meets Radha and asks her to come along with him, but she refuses. Desperate Ramu leaves the town and becomes a wanderer. After five years, Ramu returns but Radha forbidden him then he decides to surrender to police for which Radha disagrees and hides him secretly in the house. Once their son falls sick, Ramu moves to Brahmam and requests him a small amount for medicines when he refuses, Ramu takes it forcibly which Radha throws away. Meanwhile, Brahmam informs police regarding the whereabouts of Ramu, by the time, they reach Radha makes him run around and she gets arrested. Finally, Ramu surrenders himself to make penance for his sins.

Cast 
N. T. Rama Rao as Ramu
Rajasulochana as Radha
S. V. Ranga Rao as Prabhakar
Relangi as Rama Brahmam
C.S.R as Chandraiah
Girija as Julie
Hemalatha as Rajyam
Sandhya as Lalitha
Master Nagaraju as Young Ramu

Soundtrack 

Music composed by Ghantasala. Lyrics were written by Samudrala Jr.

References

External links 

 

Indian action drama films
Films directed by C. S. Rao
Films scored by Ghantasala (musician)
1960s action drama films